Grasseella is a genus in the phylum Apicomplexa.

History

This genus was created by Tuzet and Ormières in 1960.

Taxonomy

There is one species recognised in this genus.

Description

This species infects an ascidian worm (Microcosmus sulcatus).

The oocysts have many sporocysts, each with 2 sporozoites.

References

Apicomplexa genera
Monotypic SAR supergroup genera
Conoidasida